Thai Life Insurance Public Co. Ltd or simply Thai Life Insurance is the first Thai insurance company . The company was founded in 1942 and is headquartered in Bangkok, Thailand. It was one of largest insurance companies in Thailand.

Nowadays it is a financial services group in Thailand with the slogan Thai Life Insurance. Life, Beside You.

The Chaiyawan Family sold a 15% stake for around $750 million to Meiji Yasuda life insurance in 2013. 

The company is known for commissioning a number of emotional television commercials that have garnered global attention.

References

External links
 Official website

Financial services companies established in 1942
Companies based in Bangkok
Insurance companies of Thailand
Thai brands
Thai Royal Warrant holders
1942 establishments in Thailand